The 2022 Grand Prix Zagreb Open, is a wrestling event was held in Zagreb, Croatia between 29 and 30 January 2022. This international tournament includes competition men's Greco-Roman wrestling.

Event videos
The event was air freely on the Zagreb Wrestling Association YouTube channel.  

⇒ 29 January Saturday, 10.30 – 19.00 qualification and elimination rounds, all weight categories (on 3 wrestling mats)

⇒ 30 January Sunday, 10.30 – 14.00 Repechage bouts and bronze medal matches (all categories), 18.00 - 20.00 Opening ceremony and Final matches (all categories)

Medal table

Team ranking

Medal overview

Greco-Roman

Participating nations

163 competitors from 24 nations participated.
 (2)
 (10)
 (12)
 (2)
 (4)
 (5)
 (3)
 (1)
 (9)
 (2)
 (1)
 (12)
 (3)
 (9)
 (9)
 (1)
 (10)
 (8)
 (7)
 (3)
 (12)
 (19)
 (13)
 (7)

References 

2022 in Croatian sport
2022 in sport wrestling